Flight 527 may refer to:

Lake Central Flight 527, crashed on 5 March 1967
Lufthansa Flight 527, crashed on 26 July 1979

0527